George N. Neise (February 16, 1917April 14, 1996) was an American character actor. He made over 120 film and television appearances between 1942 and 1978.

Early years
Born in Chicago, Illinois, Neise was the son of Edwin Neise and Bertha Hagen. He graduated from the University of Wisconsin, where he studied finance.

Career
Neise began his career playing soldiers in war-themed films.

Beginning in 1937, Neise acted in radio in Chicago, playing a variety of roles in programs. He acted in stock theater with the Peninsula Players in the summers of 1938 and 1939. His Broadway credits include Grandma's Diary (1948).

Neise served for four-and-a-half years as a pilot in the United States Army Air Corps in World War II. After that, he became an in-demand character actor, playing everything from Greek kings to angry bosses to airline pilots.

He may be best remembered for the dual role as the patronizing pharmacist Ralph Dimsal and powerful Ancient Greek king, Odius in the Three Stooges feature The Three Stooges Meet Hercules. He also appeared as Martian Ogg and an unnamed airline pilot in the trio's next feature The Three Stooges in Orbit.

Neise played Nat Wyndham on the television Western Wichita Town (1959-1960). His other TV appearances in Westerns were The Lone Ranger, Death Valley Days, Cheyenne, Zorro, Have Gun–Will Travel, The Rifleman, Maverick and as the wanted man in the episode of Robert Culp's TV series, Trackdown, which essentially became the pilot episode of Wanted: Dead or Alive.

Neise played in television dramas such as Perry Mason, in which he made five appearances. Because of the dishonest character roles he played, he was the murder victim in four of the episodes: Albert Tydings in the 1957 episode, "The Case of the Baited Hook," Wilfred Borden in the 1959 episode "The Case of the Calendar Girl," Morley Theilman in the 1962 episode "The Case of the Shapely Shadow," and Stacey Garnett in the 1965 episode "The Case of the Golden Girls." Neise continued being cast as a 'heavy', appearing as a safe cracker in Official Detective TV series episode The Blind Man in 1957. He also appeared on sitcoms such as The Dick Van Dyke Show, Green Acres, The Andy Griffith Show, Mister Ed, The Addams Family, Gilligan's Island, Hogan's Heroes, Adam-12, and Get Smart.

Death
Neise died from cancer at his home in Hollywood on April 14, 1996, at age 79. His surviving family included three children, Richard, Edward George, and Gregory from his second wife, Danielle Gentile as well as  daughters Adrienne ("Bonnie") and Nikki from his first wife, Lorna Thayer.

Selected filmography

They Raid by Night (1942) - Lt. Erik Falken
Flight Lieutenant (1942) - Radio Operator (uncredited)
War Dogs (1942) - Hans
Valley of Hunted Men (1942) - Paul Schiller
USS VD: Ship of Shame (1942) - Sailor (uncredited)
Chetniks! The Fighting Guerrillas (1943) - German Scout (uncredited)
They Got Me Covered (1943) - Matthews (uncredited)
Air Force (1943) - Hickam Field Radio Operator (uncredited)
Hangmen Also Die! (1943) - Mueller (uncredited)
Action in the North Atlantic (1943) - German Lieutenant (uncredited)
Bomber's Moon (1943) - The Gestapo Lieutenant
Sahara (1943) - British Sergeant (uncredited)
Once Upon a Time (1944) - Aviator Lieutenant (uncredited)
Ladies of Washington (1944) - Radio Commentator (uncredited)
Man from Frisco (1944) - Narrator (uncredited)
Experiment Perilous (1944) - Alec
Romance on the High Seas (1948) - Michael's Assistant (uncredited)
One Sunday Afternoon (1948) - Chauncey (uncredited)
My Dream Is Yours (1949) - Party Guest (uncredited)
I'll See You in My Dreams (1951) - Isham Jones (uncredited)
The Sharkfighters (1956) - Cmdr. George Zimmer
Tomahawk Trail (1957) - Lt. Jonathan Davenport
Pharaoh's Curse (1957) - Robert Quentin
Jeanne Eagels (1957) - Jerry the Traveling Salesman (uncredited)
The Tall Stranger (1957) - Mort Harper
Outcasts of the City (1958) - Hans Welton
Fort Massacre (1958) - Pendleton
No Time for Sergeants (1958) - Baker (uncredited)
Twenty Plus Two (1961) - Walter Collinson
The Three Stooges Meet Hercules (1962) - Ralph Dimsal / King Odius
Rome Adventure (1962) - Benjamin Bentley (uncredited)
The Three Stooges in Orbit (1962) - Ogg / Airline Pilot
Cattle King (1963) - Clancy - Reporter (uncredited)
Johnny Cool (1963) - Adrian Guinness
Looking for Love (1964) - Mr. Harvey Miller (uncredited)
Two on a Guillotine (1965) - Reporter at Funeral (uncredited)
Brainstorm (1965) - Party Guest (uncredited)
I'll Take Sweden (1965) - Man in Bed with Blonde (uncredited)
Do Not Disturb (1965) - Swedish Delegate (uncredited)
Inside Daisy Clover (1965) - Director (uncredited)
A Fine Madness (1966) - Television Interviewer (uncredited)
Any Wednesday (1966) - Art Gallery Visitor (uncredited)
Penelope (1966) - Mr. Halliday (uncredited)
A Guide for the Married Man (1967) - Man in bed at Banner Motel 
Did You Hear the One About the Traveling Saleslady? (1968) - Ben Milford
The Girl Who Knew Too Much (1969) - Marvin Easely
The Computer Wore Tennis Shoes (1969) - College of Knowledge Sponsor (uncredited)
On a Clear Day You Can See Forever (1970) - Wytelipt 
The Barefoot Executive (1971) - Network Executive

Notes

References

External links

Male actors from Chicago
American male film actors
United States Army Air Forces pilots of World War II
Deaths from cancer in California
1917 births
1996 deaths
20th-century American male actors
Western (genre) television actors
Wisconsin School of Business alumni
Military personnel from Illinois